Acuminite is a rare halide mineral with chemical formula: SrAlF4(OH)·(H2O).  Its name comes from the Latin word acumen, meaning "spear point".  Its Mohs scale rating is 3.5.

Acumenite has only been described from its type locality of the cryolite deposit in Ivigtut, Greenland.

See also
 List of minerals

References

Strontium minerals
Aluminium minerals
Fluorine minerals
Monoclinic minerals
Minerals in space group 15